Tritoxa incurva is a species of picture-winged fly in the genus Tritoxa of the family Ulidiidae.

The flies are about 6–8 mm long. They have bold wing pattern and rusty-brown coloration, at least in the east. They live in eastern United States, and can be found in grassy meadows from May till October.

Distribution
United States.

Bibliography 
 Insects: Their Natural History And Diversity: With a Photographic Guide to Insects of Eastern North America; Stephen A. Marshall. 2006. Firefly Books Ltd.; See color photograph-496.6
 Insects of North Carolina;  C.S. Brimley. 1938. North Carolina Department of Agriculture. p. 381

References

Ulidiidae
Diptera of North America
Taxa named by Hermann Loew
Insects described in 1873